The Roman Catholic Diocese of Oberá is a Catholic diocese located in the city of Oberá in the Ecclesiastical province of Corrientes in Argentina.

History
On 13 June 2009, Pope Benedict XVI established the Diocese of Oberá from the Diocese of Posadas and the Diocese of Puerto Iguazú.

Ordinaries
Victor Selvino Arenhart † (13 June 2009 – 17 May 2010) Died
Damián Santiago Bitar (26 October 2010 – Present)

References

Roman Catholic dioceses in Argentina
Roman Catholic Ecclesiastical Province of Corrientes
Christian organizations established in 2009
Roman Catholic dioceses and prelatures established in the 21st century
Oberá